The 1971 Federation Cup was the ninth edition of what is now known as the Fed Cup. 14 nations participated in the tournament, which was held at the Royal King's Park Tennis Club in Perth, Western Australia, from 26–29 December 1970. Australia defended their title, defeating Great Britain in the final, and winning the title without losing a rubber.

Participating teams

Draw
All ties were played at the Royal King's Park Tennis Club in Perth, Australia on grass courts.

First round
France vs. Japan

Canada vs. Netherlands

South Africa vs. Indonesia

Italy vs. United States

Argentina vs. New Zealand

Quarterfinals
France vs. Netherlands

South Africa vs. United States

New Zealand vs. Great Britain

Semifinals
Australia vs. France

United States vs. Great Britain

Final
Australia vs. Great Britain

Consolation Round

Draw

First round
Canada vs. Italy

Semifinals
Japan vs. Argentina

Indonesia vs. Canada

Final
Japan vs. Indonesia'

References

Billie Jean King Cups by year
Federation Cup
Federation Cup
Federation Cup
Federation Cup
Federation Cup
Federation Cup